The men's marathon at the 1992 Summer Olympics in Barcelona, Spain, was held on Sunday August 9, 1992. The race started at 18:30h local time. One hundred and ten athletes from 72 nations started; 87 athletes completed the race, with Pyambuugiin Tuul from Mongolia finishing in last position in 4:00:44 (the first Olympic marathon runner to finish over 4 hours since 1908). The maximum number of athletes per nation had been set at 3 since the 1930 Olympic Congress. The event was won by Hwang Young-Cho of South Korea, the nation's first Olympic men's marathon medal. Koichi Morishita's silver was Japan's first medal in the event since 1968. Stephan Freigang of Germany took bronze, the first medal for Germany in the event though East Germany had won two golds (both by Waldemar Cierpinski) during partition.

Background

This was the 22nd appearance of the event, which is one of 12 athletics events to have been held at every Summer Olympics. Returning runners from the 1988 marathon included seven of the top eight finishers: gold medalist Gelindo Bordin of Italy, silver medalist Douglas Wakiihuri of Kenya, bronze medalist	Hussein Ahmed Salah of Djibouti, fourth-place finisher Takeyuki Nakayama of Japan, fifth-place finisher Steve Moneghetti and eighth-place finisher Robert de Castella of Australia, and seventh-place finisher Juma Ikangaa of Tanzania. The world record holder, Belayneh Dinsamo of Ethiopia, did not enter; the 1991 World champion, Hiromi Taniguchi of Japan, did. The field was "very wide open as nobody had dominated the event in the preceding years." 

Aruba, Bahrain, Cameroon, Liechtenstein, Mauritania, Mongolia, Namibia, San Marino, Slovenia, and Syria each made their first appearance in Olympic men's marathons; some former Soviet republics appeared as the Unified Team in the team's only Summer Games. The United States made its 21st appearance, most of any nation, having missed only the boycotted 1980 Games.

Competition format and course

As all Olympic marathons, the competition was a single race. The marathon distance of 26 miles, 385 yards was run over a point-to-point route starting at Mataró and finishing at the Olympic Stadium. The course ran along the Catalan coast, finishing with a "brutal" climb of 150 metres up Montjuïc to the stadium. Because of the timing of the race so close to the closing ceremony, an alternate finish line outside the stadium was used for runners finishing in over 2 hours and 45 minutes.

Records

These were the standing world and Olympic records prior to the 1992 Summer Olympics.

No new world or Olympic bests were set during the competition.

Schedule

It was a hot day (27° C. or 80° F.), somewhat mitigated by the late start at 6:30 p.m. The schedule put the top finishers in the stadium just before the closing ceremony started, but slower runners could not finish in the stadium due to the ceremony.

All times are Central European Summer Time (UTC+2)

Results

See also
 1990 Men's European Championships Marathon (Split)
 1991 Men's World Championships Marathon (Tokyo)
 1992 Marathon Year Ranking
 1993 Men's World Championships Marathon (Stuttgart)

References

External links
  Marathon Info

M
Marathons at the Olympics
1992 marathons
Men's marathons
Men's events at the 1992 Summer Olympics